The Cheverly–Washington Business Park Line, designated Route F13, is a weekday only bus route operated by the Washington Metropolitan Area Transit Authority between Cheverly station of the Orange line of the Washington Metro and Washington Business Park (Forbes Blvd & Senate Drive) in Lanham, Maryland. The line runs every 30–33 minutes during rush hours and 60 minutes at all other times on weekdays only. Trips take roughly 55 minutes.

Background
Route F13 operates on weekdays, only running between Cheverly station and Washington Business Park and connecting passengers via New Carrollton station and Prince Georges Hospital. Route F13 operates out of Landover division.

History
Route F13 initially started by WMATA on November 21, 1978, when New Carrollton station opened. The F13 replaced route A13, which was discontinued on November 21, 1978, which used to operate on Martin Luther King Jr. Highway, up to Washington Business Park in Lanham, Maryland. Route F13 operated between the New Carrollton station and Washington Business Park in Lanham, MD via Garden City Drive, Ardwick-Ardmore Road, Martin Luther King Jr. Highway, Boston Way, Forbes Road, Philadelphia Way, Forbes Road, Martin Luther King Junior Highway, Lottsford Road, and Forbes Road as part of the Ardwick Industrial Park Shuttle Line running alongside route F12.

The F13 was also rerouted to operate between the New Carrollton Metro Station and Washington Business Park via Ellin Road, Harkins Road, Annapolis Road, Whitfield Chapel Road, Martin Luther King Jr. Highway, instead of its original routing between the New Carrollton and Washington Business Park via Garden City Drive, Ardwick-Ardmore Road, and Martin Luther King Jr. Highway. The former routing was replaced by route F14.

1993 Service Changes
On December 11, 1993, route F13 was extended from New Carrollton station to Cheverly station via Ellin Road, Harkins Road, Annapolis Road, Cooper Lane, Old Landover Road, Landover Road, Prince George's Hospital Roadway, Aaron Deitz Drive, Prince George's Hospital Roadway, Cheverly Avenue, and Columbia Park Road.The extension was to provide additionally service on Cheverly Avenue to route F8, since routes F1 and F2 were rerouted to no longer operate on Cheverly Avenue.

2017 Service Changes
On June 25, 2017, route F13 was rerouted near Washington Business Park discontinuing service along Boston Way. From northbound Martin Luther King, Jr. Highway, buses will operate to Lottsford-Vista Road, Forbes Boulevard and Philadelphia Way before returning to southbound Martin Luther King, Jr. Highway. Nearby stops will be served along Forbes Boulevard at Boston Way.

References

Orange Line (Washington Metro)
F13
1978 establishments in Washington, D.C.
Transportation in Prince George's County, Maryland